Himamaylan, officially the City of Himamaylan, is a 3rd class component city in the province of Negros Occidental, Philippines. According to the 2020 census, it has a population of 116,240 people.

Due to its coastal location, it is a rich source of different types of seafood, mainly fish, oysters, mussels and shrimps. The city celebrates the Himaya-an Festival every April 14–25.

Himamaylan became a city on March 5, 2001, through a proclamation by President Gloria Macapagal Arroyo under Republic Act No. 9028. It is the only city in the 5th District of the province.

Etymology
The term "Himamaylan" is a portmanteau of the two Hiligaynon words hima and babaylan. It is alleged that the settlement's early Malay inhabitants suffered from a foot malady called himà, and their employment of witch doctors called babaylan. However, due to difficulty of the Spaniards to pronounce the words, it became Himamaylan.

During the Spanish colonisation, it was once spelt as "Gimamaylan".

History
In 1795, Himamaylan became the capital of Negros. At that time, the city served as a garrison for occupying Spanish forces. Today, the old Spanish-built fort constructed as a lookout point for frequent Moro raids is one of the historical attractions found in the city.

Cityhood

In 2001, the Philippine Congress passed Republic Act No. 9028, providing for the conversion of the municipality into a city after a favourable plebiscite.

Geography
Himamaylan is located at the centre-most cove on the coastline of Negros Island. Himamaylan has a natural harbour characterised by deep waters favourable to access by marine vessels.

Located in the centre of the island, the city is conducive to operations reaching all parts of the country and the rest of Southeast Asia from a strategic point. Most portions of the city are plains and generally have fertile soil, conducive for agriculture.

Barangays

Himamaylan City is politically subdivided into 19 barangays.

Climate

Demographics

The people in the city speak the Hiligaynon language (often called Ilonggo). Filipino and English are generally understood.

Economy

The city's main sources of livelihood include fishery, sugarcane farming and sugar production, rice farming, mango cultivation and ethanol exports.

References

External links

 [ Philippine Standard Geographic Code]
Philippine Census Information
Local Governance Performance Management System

Cities in Negros Occidental
Populated places established in 1795
1795 establishments in the Philippines
Component cities in the Philippines